The Hyatt Regency Columbus is a high-rise hotel in Columbus, Ohio. The structure was completed in 1980. The Hyatt Regency Columbus was designed by architects Prindle, Patrick + Associates, an architectural and engineering firm. The building contains a four-star Hyatt hotel, which consists of 615 rooms and 16 suites, as well as a grand ballroom and 32 conference rooms.

See also
 List of tallest buildings in Columbus, Ohio

References

External links
 Official site

Skyscrapers in Columbus, Ohio
Skyscraper hotels in Ohio
Hyatt Hotels and Resorts
Buildings in downtown Columbus, Ohio
Hotels in Columbus, Ohio
Brutalist architecture in Ohio